Tropovci is a village in the Municipality of Tišina in the Prekmurje region of northeastern Slovenia.

References

External links
Tropovci on Geopedia

Populated places in the Municipality of Tišina